"Masochistic Beauty" is a song by American soul singer Marvin Gaye, released posthumously in 1985 by Columbia Records.

Background
Unlike the majority of Gaye's music, the song is a dedication to S&M, which was something that Gaye was known to have an interest in. The lyrics find Gaye playing the role of a dominatrix in a faux British accent where he raps throughout the track. The song shares some similarities to "Sanctified Lady", receiving vocoder work from Gordon Banks, and having an electro-funk flavor. Both controversial tracks were also unfinished outtakes from the Midnight Love sessions, which received later work from Gordon Banks, and were released on the posthumous Dream of a Lifetime album.

Credits
Lead vocals by Marvin Gaye and Gordon Banks (vocoder)
Instrumentation by Marvin Gaye and Gordon Banks 
Produced by Gordon Banks

References

Songs written by Marvin Gaye
Marvin Gaye songs
Song recordings produced by Gordon Banks (musician)
Songs released posthumously
1985 songs
Songs about BDSM